Nicholas Rogers (born December 7, 1987) is an American professional racing cyclist. He rode at the 2015 UCI Track Cycling World Championships.

References

External links

1987 births
Living people
American male cyclists
Place of birth missing (living people)